Archostola tianmushana is a moth in the Carposinidae family. It was described by Hun in 2001. It is found in China.

References

Natural History Museum Lepidoptera generic names catalog

Carposinidae
Moths described in 2001